Arturo Fernando Zaldívar Lelo de Larrea (born August 9, 1959) is a Mexican lawyer who has been a member of the  Supreme Court of Justice of the Nation since December 2009. Zaldívar served as President of the Court (Chief Justice) from January 2, 2019, to January 1, 2023.

Biography
He obtained his law degree at the Escuela Libre de Derecho (ELD) and completed a Law PhD at the National Autonomous University of Mexico. He has tenure of second year Constitutional Law at ELD and is Graduate School Professor at the same school of both Constitutional Law and Constitutional Procedure. He is also Professor of the Law Faculty at UNAM, of the LL.M. program at the Universidad Panamericana (UP), and of the LL.B. (Bachelor of Laws) at Universidad Iberoamericana.
He was a member of the commission created by the Supreme Court, in charge of reforming the Ley de Amparo (the law concerning the partial judicial review and the protection of the civil rights embedded in the Constitution).

He was a consultant for the Law division of the Instituto Tecnológico Autónomo de México (ITAM) regarding the design of the Graduate Program in Administrative Law, member of the academic committees of the Instituto de la Judicatura Federal (Institute of Federal Judicature) and the Tribunal Electoral del Poder Judicial de la Federación (Federal Electoral Tribunal).

He held a private practice for 25 years.

He was founder and Vice President of the Instituto Mexicano de Derecho Procesal Constitucional (Mexican Institute of Constitutional Procedure), member of the Mexican division of the directive committee  of the Instituto Iberoamericano de Derecho Procesal Constitucional  (Iberoamerican Institute of Procedural Constitutional Law), member of the graduate school counsel of Constitutional Law and Human Rights program at UP, member of the Barra Mexicana-Colegio de Abogados (Mexican Bar and Advocate’s College). He is also member of several Law Review committees and consultant for a number of Law Schools and Law Institutes in the Country and the region.

He is the author of Hacia una nueva ley de Amparo (Towards a new Ley de Amparo) and has published more than seventy essays in specialized journals and international publications.

Supreme Court Nomination
In 2009 President Felipe Calderón  nominated him as a Minister (Associate Justice) of the Supreme Court to fill the vacancy left after the retirement of Genaro David Góngora Pimentel.   Zaldívar was confirmed by the Senate with 90 votes on December 1, 2009.

References

1959 births
Living people
20th-century Mexican lawyers
Escuela Libre de Derecho alumni
National Autonomous University of Mexico alumni
Presidents of the Supreme Court of Justice of the Nation
21st-century Mexican lawyers
Academic staff of Escuela Libre de Derecho